Denayer is a surname. Notable people with the surname include:

Félix Denayer (born 1990), Belgian field hockey player
Jason Denayer (born 1995), Belgian footballer